Patricia Hymanson is an American physician and politician from Maine. Hymanson, a Democrat from York, Maine, has served in the Maine House of Representatives since December 2014. She has also served on the York School Committee, including as chair.

Hymanson is a practicing neurologist and has had a practice in York since 1988. Her district includes all of the town of Ogunquit, Maine as well portions of the towns of Wells, Sanford and her residence in York. Hymanson attended public schools in Yonkers, New York before earning a B.A. from Yale University and a M.D. from New York Medical College.

In 2020, Hymanson sought her fourth consecutive term in the Maine House of Representatives.

References

Year of birth missing (living people)
Living people
People from York, Maine
People from Yonkers, New York
Yale University alumni
New York Medical College alumni
Democratic Party members of the Maine House of Representatives
Women state legislators in Maine
School board members in Maine
Physicians from Maine
American neurologists
Women neurologists
21st-century American politicians
21st-century American women politicians
Scientists from New York (state)